Byblia is a genus of nymphalid butterflies, commonly called jokers, found in the Africa and the Indian subcontinent.

These butterflies are orange with black markings. They are attracted to rotting fruit and frequently open and close their wings when resting.

Species
Listed alphabetically:
Byblia anvatara (Boisduval, 1833) – common joker
Byblia ilithyia (Drury, [1773]) – spotted joker

References

External links 

Byblia, Encyclopedia of Life

Biblidinae
Nymphalidae genera
Taxa named by Jacob Hübner